The 2013 season was Brann's 27th consecutive year in Tippeligaen and their third full season with Rune Skarsfjord as their manager. They participated in the Tippeligaen, finishing 8th, and the Cup where they reached the Third Round before defeat by Adeccoligaen side Mjøndalen.

Squad

Reserve squad 
As of February, 2013, according to official Brann website.

Transfers

Winter

In:

Out:

Summer

In:

Out:

Competitions

Tippeligaen

Results summary

Results by round

Results

Table

Norwegian Cup

Squad statistics

Appearances and goals

|-
|colspan="14"|Players away from Brann on loan:
|-
|colspan="14"|Players who left Brann during the season:

|}

Goal scorers

Disciplinary record

Notes

References

SK Brann seasons
Brann